The Director-General of Public Service (Malay: Ketua Pengarah Perkhidmatan Awam) is the head of the Public Service Department in Malaysia.

History
The post "Director General Of Public Service" in Malaysia dates back to 1934, the title used by the Head of Administrative Service was Malayan Establishment Officer, the inaugural holder was Sir John Huggins. Subsequently, when A.J. Gracie held the position in 1954, the title was changed to Federation Establishment Officer. After H.G. Turner replaced Gracie in 1957 until Tan Sri Ahmad Husin assumed the position of Head of Public Sector Service in 1960, the title used was Principal Establishment Officer (P.E.O).

The title was changed to Ketua Pegawai Perjawatan in 1962 and remained in use until 1967, which was when Tunku Mohamed Tunku Besar Burhanuddin led the public service. In 1967, Pejabat Perjawatan Persekutuan was renamed as Establishment Office of Malaysia. When Tan Sri Abdul Kadir Shamsuddin helmed the leadership, the title was changed to Pengarah Perjawatan Malaysia in 1968 at the same year the name Jabatan Perkhidmatan Awam (JPA) was first used on 15 August 1968. Later, it was changed to the title of Ketua Pengarah Perkhidmatan Awam (KPPA) as used in Service Circular No. 2 Year 1968 dated 7 October 1968.

List of directors-general
Since 1934, PSD (and its original department) has been led by 25 Directors General of Public Service, as shown below:

References

Government of Malaysia
Malaysian civil servants